Wheeler Williams (November 30, 1897 – August 12, 1972) was an American sculptor, born in Chicago, Illinois.

Life and career
Williams studied sculpture at the School of the Art Institute of Chicago.  He attended Yale, where he graduated magna cum laude in 1919.  He received a Master of Architecture degree from Harvard in 1922.  Williams studied at the École des Beaux-Arts in Paris.

He was one of a dozen sculptors invited to compete  in the Pioneer Woman statue competition in 1927, which he failed to win.  His model for that competition was later enlarged, cast and placed in front of the public library in Liberty, Kansas.

Williams was a recipient of a Gould Medal at the Paris Exposition in 1937.  He was a member of the National Academy, past president of the Fine Arts Federation of New York, and longtime president of the National Sculpture Society.  Wheeler was also the founder and president of the American Artist Professional League.

Political involvement
Williams was a supporter of the House Un-American Activities Committee's search for communist "reds" in the arts.  He also protested the Congressional censure of Joseph McCarthy.

Williams also served on the jury for the Alger Hiss treason trial.

Very active in Republican circles, many of Williams' commissions reflect his conservative positions (for example the Robert A. Taft Memorial in Washington, DC).

Public monuments
 1930 "Tablets to Pioneers", Michigan Avenue Bridge, Chicago, IL
 1935 "Communications" West Pediment of the Environmental Protection Agency Building (formerly Interstate Commerce Commission), Federal Triangle, Washington, DC
 1938 "Indian Bowman," United States Post Office-Canal Street Station, New York, NY
 1942 "Settlers of the Seaboard", Fairmount Park, Philadelphia, PA
 1949 "The Venus of Manhattan", Madison Avenue Facade, Parke Bernet Gallery, New York, NY
 1951 four servicemen sculpture on the Wall of the Missing, Cambridge American Cemetery and Memorial, Cambridge, England
 1952 "Fountain of the Water Babies", Children's Hospital, Seattle, WA
 1952 "Wave of Life", Houston Main Building (HMB) of The University of Texas M.D. Anderson Cancer Center; was the Prudential S.W. regional office until 1974. Houston, TX
 1955 "Robert A. Taft" plaque, Indian Hill Church Cemetery, Indian Hill, OH
 1956 "Colonel Robert R. McCormick" bronze sculpture, Colonel's Place, Baie-Comeau, QC, Canada
 1956 Commodore John Barry Memorial, Wexford, Ireland
 1959 "Robert A. Taft Memorial," Capitol Grounds, Washington, DC
 1960 "Muse of the Missouri" Fountain, Kansas City, MO
 1961 "Spring, Summer, Fall," Memphis, TN

References
"Questioning 'Modern'", August 23, 1942, New York Times
"Petition Drive Set To Back McCarthy",  November 15, 1954, New York Times
"Hiss Offers Not Guilty Plea", December 17, 1948, New York Times
Goode, James M. The Outdoor Sculpture of Washington D.C., Smithsonian Institution Press, Washington D.C.  1974
Gurney, George, Sculpture and the Federal Triangle, Smithsonian Institution Press, Washington D.C.  1985

1897 births
1972 deaths
American architectural sculptors
American male sculptors
Artists from Chicago
School of the Art Institute of Chicago alumni
American alumni of the École des Beaux-Arts
Yale University alumni
Harvard Graduate School of Design alumni
20th-century American sculptors
National Sculpture Society members
Sculptors from Illinois
20th-century American male artists
Section of Painting and Sculpture artists